Hala S. Ayala (born 1973) is an American politician who represented the 51st district in the Virginia House of Delegates from 2018 to 2022. She was the Democratic nominee in the 2021 Virginia lieutenant gubernatorial election, losing to Republican nominee Winsome Sears on November 2, 2021.

Early life and education
Ayala is a native of Alexandria, Virginia. Growing up, Ayala’s family struggled financially. She graduated from Woodbridge Senior High School, and has an associate’s degree in psychology from the University of Phoenix.

Ayala's father was an immigrant from El Salvador, and also has North African roots. Ayala's mother was Irish and Lebanese. When Ayala was pregnant, her job did not offer any health insurance but she qualified for Medicaid, which provided healthcare for her and her son.

Career

Ayala formerly worked for the United States Department of Homeland Security as a cybersecurity specialist. She also formerly led the Prince William County chapter of the National Organization for Women, serving as chapter president in 2014. She also served on the Virginia Council on Women as an appointee of Governor Terry McAuliffe for a term expiring on June 30, 2016.

Ayala cites the documentary Miss Representation as inspiration for her to become involved in politics, and was a volunteer for Barack Obama's reelection campaign in 2012. In 2017, Ayala was an organizer of the Women's March against Donald Trump.

Ayala ran for the Virginia House of Delegates in the 2017 elections for the 51st district, which covers much of Prince William County. The district specifically stretches "from just northwest of Occoquan, in eastern Prince William, to Nokesville on the county's western border." District 51 was a key pickup target for Virginia Democrats because it was one of 17 House of Delegates districts that voted for Hillary Clinton in the preceding year's presidential election, but was held by a Republican state house delegate. In June 2017, Ayala won the Democratic nomination for the 51st district of the Virginia House of Delegates, defeating Ken Boddye in the primary election. In the general election, Ayala defeated four-term Republican incumbent Richard L. Anderson. Ayala and Elizabeth Guzman became the first Hispanic women elected to the House. The victories were part of a Democratic sweep in the 2017 Virginia elections, which saw major gains for the party.

In July 2020, Ayala announced her candidacy for Lieutenant Governor of Virginia in the 2021 election. In December 2020, she announced she would not seek reelection to her House of Delegates seat. In June 2021, Ayala became the Democratic nominee for Lieutenant Governor of Virginia. She lost the November election to Winsome Sears.

Legislative initiatives
Drawing on her 18 years as an information security specialist for the U.S. Coast Guard, Ayala has made information and cyber security one focus of her efforts. Her bill requiring tax preparers to report security breaches became law. Ayala has also introduced bills for creating a state interagency cybersecurity task force, training state employees, increasing security of network-connected devices, and requiring digital services to remove information about minors upon request.

Committee assignments
Ayala served as a member of the Science and Technology Committee and the Finance Committee.

Personal life
Ayala lives in Lake Ridge, Virginia. She has two children.

Electoral history

References

External links

 Campaign website
 
 

1973 births
21st-century American politicians
21st-century American women politicians
American people of Irish descent
American politicians of Lebanese descent
American politicians of Salvadoran descent
Candidates in the 2021 United States elections
Hispanic and Latino American state legislators in Virginia
Hispanic and Latino American women in politics
Living people
Democratic Party members of the Virginia House of Delegates
People from Alexandria, Virginia
People from Prince William County, Virginia
United States Department of Homeland Security officials
University of Phoenix alumni
Women state legislators in Virginia